The National Association of Therapeutic Schools and Programs (NATSAP) is a United States trade organization of therapeutic schools, residential treatment programs, wilderness programs, outdoor therapeutic programs, young adult programs, and home-based residential programs for adolescents and young adults with emotional and behavioral difficulties. It was formed in January 1999 by the founders of six programs within the so-called "troubled teen industry," and its board of directors consists of program owners and educational consultants. Ironically, all but one of those founding six programs have been shut down in the ensuing years for a variety of reasons, including child abuse, neglect, licensing violations, and successful class action lawsuits.

NATSAP is not an accrediting or licensing body. In order to be members, schools and programs are required to be in full compliance with NATSAP's published Ethical Principles and Principles of Good Practice.  However, in United States House Committee on Education and Labor hearings in October 2007, NATSAP Director Jan Moss stated that the organization had no process for checking up on this compliance, nor correcting any programs that stray from these guidelines.

The organization publishes a professional journal, the Journal of Therapeutic Schools and Programs, conducts conferences and workshops, and publishes a directory of its members.

References

Further reading 
 Maia Szalavitz (2006), Help at Any Cost, Riverhead. .

External links
 NATSAP official website

Organizations established in 1999
United States schools associations
Mental health organizations in Maryland
1999 establishments in the United States